Tony Rea (born 25 July 1966) is an Australian professional rugby league football coach and a former head coach for Super League club, London Broncos. A former , he played club football in the Brisbane Rugby League for Brothers, in the New South Wales Rugby League as captain of the North Sydney Bears, and in the Super League for the London Broncos, later becoming their coach. Rea also briefly coached Super Rugby team, the Brumbies before returning to London to coach the Broncos.

Early years
Rea was born on 25 July 1966 in Bundaberg, Queensland, Australia.  He began his playing career in 1984 in the local Brisbane competition at the Brothers club.

Playing career
In 1988, Rea was recruited to play in the premier NSWRL competition by North Sydney, mainly playing in the hooking position and being appointed captain when John Dorahy retired in the middle of 1989. He played seven seasons with the Bears, but lost his first grade berth to Mark Soden in the middle of 1994.

Rea was recruited in 1994 alongside many fellow Antipodeans by the new Australian owners of the London rugby league club, who changed the name of the club from London Crusaders to London Broncos.  He played for the club during the change of top-flight rugby league in England from the winter season to summer Rugby League, with the advent of the new Super League competition in 1996.

Administration
After 47 London appearances scoring 11 tries, Rea retired from playing at the end of the inaugural Super League season in 1996 to take up the Chief Executive role at the club.  He stayed in the role until 2000.

Key moments during his time as Chief Executive include:-

1997 - London Broncos defeat Australian side Canberra Raiders in the ill-fated Super League World Club Championship series
1997 - Richard Branson's Virgin empire buy a majority stake in the club  (Virgin sold stake in club in 2001)
1998 - Head coach Tony Currie leaves the club at the end of the 1998 Super League season
1999 - Club appoints Dan Stains as head coach; Stains leads Broncos to first Rugby League Challenge Cup Final in the club's (Fulham, London Crusaders, London Broncos) history. Broncos lose in the final against Leeds Rhinos
1999 - Club sacks Stains after Broncos endure long losing streak during the 1999 Super League campaign.  Rea appointed temporary joint head coach with Stains' assistant Les Kiss.  Rea and Kiss manage to steer Broncos out of slump.
1999 - Club decide to move home, from Twickenham-based Harlequins' Stoop ground to south-east London football outfit Charlton Athletic's Valley stadium (Broncos have subsequently moved to Brentford FC's Griffin Park in 2002 and back to the re-branded Twickenham Stoop in October 2005)
2000 - Club appoint John Monie as head coach.  Monie only stays in the job until the last month of the 2000 Super League season, the club endured a mediocre season during his tenure.  Rea takes over caretaker coach until the end of the season, Broncos sail to mid-table security

Coaching career
Rea was persuaded at the end of the 2000 season to become head coach on a full-time basis, so this meant he had to resign his Chief Executive role.  During his time as head coach, he led the Broncos to two post-regular season Super League play-off appearances (in 2003 and 2005).

On 8 July 2006, after a disappointing run of form for the team, the Harlequins Rugby League club announced a re-organisation of the coaching set-up.  Rea was replaced as head coach by Leeds Rhinos' assistant coach Brian McDermott, but was appointed onto the club's board of directors.

On 4 June 2008 he revealed he has accepted the assistant coach role with the Brumbies, the rugby union Super Rugby side based in Canberra. He was appointed the Brumbies 2011 head coach after Andy Friend was fired two games into the season.
In July 2012, Rea agreed to replace Rob Powell as interim London Broncos head coach until the end of the 2012 season. This was made permanent in August 2012.

In 2014 Rea stepped down as head coach of the London Broncos and was replaced by his assistant coach Joey Grima.

References

External links

"My life in rugby league: Tony Rea" interview at TotalRL.com
Tony Rea Quins Profile
Queensland representatives at qrl.com

1966 births
Living people
Australian rugby league coaches
Australian rugby league players
Australian rugby union coaches
Australian expatriate sportspeople in England
ACT Brumbies coaches
London Broncos coaches
London Broncos players
North Sydney Bears players
Past Brothers players
Rugby league hookers
Rugby league players from Bundaberg